Béziers Méditerranée is the communauté d'agglomération, an intercommunal structure, centred on the city of Béziers. It is located in the Hérault department, in the Occitanie region, southern France. It was established in January 2002. It was expanded with 4 other communes in January 2017. Its seat is in Béziers. Its area is 303.0 km2. Its population was 124,799 in 2017, of which 77,177 in Béziers proper.

Composition
The communauté d'agglomération consists of the following 17 communes:

Alignan-du-Vent
Bassan
Béziers
Boujan-sur-Libron
Cers
Corneilhan
Coulobres
Espondeilhan
Lieuran-lès-Béziers
Lignan-sur-Orb
Montblanc
Sauvian
Sérignan
Servian
Valras-Plage
Valros
Villeneuve-lès-Béziers

References

Agglomeration communities in France
Intercommunalities of Hérault